Fodboldpræsten is a 1951 Danish family film directed by Alice O'Fredericks.

Cast
Jørgen Reenberg as Præst Søren Holm
Grethe Thordahl as Inger Dahl
Ib Schønberg as Direktør Jacob Dahl
Peter Malberg as Degnen Ottesen
Helga Frier as Fru Dahl
Inger Stender as Aase Dahl
Johannes Meyer as Prokurist Nielsen
Erika Voigt as Menighedsrådsformand Fru Andersen
Preben Neergaard as Ole Dahl
William Rosenberg as Egon Petersen
Buster Larsen as Mads
Louis Miehe-Renard as Peter Hansen
Tove Maës as Lilly
Hannah Bjarnhof as Jytte Dahl
Elise Berg Madsen as Lise Lotte Dahl
Betty Helsengreen as Tjenestepigen Maria
Henry Nielsen - Kustode
Poul Müller as Læge
Ole Monty as Tilskuer
Gunnar Hansen as himself
Agnes Rehni as Peters Mor

External links

1951 films
1950s Danish-language films
Danish black-and-white films
Films directed by Alice O'Fredericks
Films scored by Sven Gyldmark